BFS may refer to:

Science and technology
Big Falcon Ship, precursor of SpaceX Starship

Benign fasciculation syndrome, a neurological disorder
Blow fill seal, a manufacturing technique

Computing
 Basic feasible solution, in linear programming
 Be File System, the native file system for the Be Operating System
 Best-first search, a path finding algorithm
 Boot File System, a file system used on UnixWare to store files necessary to its boot process
 Breadth-first search, a graph search algorithm 
 Brain Fuck Scheduler, a process scheduler for the Linux kernel

Organisations
BFS Group, foodservice wholesaler and distributor
Bournemouth Film School, part of Arts University Bournemouth
Basketball Federation of Slovenia, sports governing body
 Bibby Financial Services, UK-based multinational financial services provider
 Bio Fuel Systems, a Spanish company using captured CO2 to create fuel
 British Fantasy Society, a group dedicated to promoting the best in the fantasy, science fiction and horror genres
 Bureau of the Fiscal Service, a US Treasury Department bureau
 Federal Statistical Office (Switzerland) (BfS)
 Beltane Fire Society, arts charity based in Edinburgh, Scotland that organises twice-yearly festivals
 Brooklyn Friends School, school in Brooklyn, New York, United States
 Busan Foreign School, school in Busan, South Korea

Other uses

 Bowling for Soup, a pop-punk band based in Denton, Texas, US
 Belfast International Airport (IATA airport code)